( or ) or the Westrogothic law is the oldest Swedish text written in Latin script and the oldest of all Swedish provincial laws. It was compiled in the early 13th century, probably at least partly at the instigation of Eskil Magnusson and was the code of law used in the provinces of Västergötland and Dalsland and in Mo härad during the latter half of that century. The earliest complete text is dated 1281. Small fragments of an older text have been dated 1250.

The oldest manuscript of  contains other material added by a priest called Laurentius in Vedum around 1325. This material is of varying nature, including notes on the border between Sweden and Denmark and lists of bishops in Skara, lawspeakers in Västergötland and Swedish kings. The latter begins with Olof Skötkonung and ends with Johan Sverkersson.

In these years, Swedish men left to enlist in the Byzantine Varangian Guard in such numbers that  declared no one could inherit while staying in "Greece"—the then Scandinavian term for the Byzantine Empire—to stop the emigration, especially as two other European courts simultaneously also recruited Scandinavians: Kievan Rus' c. 980–1060 and London 1018–1066 (the Þingalið).

See also

Geats
Stones of Mora
Varangians
Varangian Guard

References

Notes

Citations

External links
 The Old Västergötland Law from the World Digital Library
Äldre Västgötalagen from the Swedish Literature Bank
Old Swedish and old Icelandic manuscripts from the National Library of Sweden
 Collin, H. S. and C. J. Schlyter (eds), Corpus iuris Sueo-Gotorum antiqui: Samling af Sweriges gamla lagar, på Kongl. Maj:ts. nådigste befallning, 13 vols (Stockholm: Haeggström, 1827--77), vol. 1 at 

Germanic legal codes
Swedish non-fiction literature
Earliest known manuscripts by language
12th-century books
Legal history of Sweden
13th century in law